Edlingham railway station served the village of Edlingham, Northumberland, England from 1887 to 1953 on the Cornhill Branch.

History 
The station was opened on 5 September 1887 by the North Eastern Railway. It was situated at the end of an approach road that runs north from the B6341. To the west of the station was a goods yard, which had two sidings, one serving a cattle dock and the other serving a small goods shed. The goods traffic at the station was never large: only six wagons of livestock were loaded in 1913. The station was downgraded to an unstaffed halt on 23 August 1926 and closed to passengers on 22 September 1930. The name was changed to Edlingham Siding on 14 February 1938; it finally closed completely on 2 March 1953.

References

External links 

Disused railway stations in Northumberland
Former North Eastern Railway (UK) stations
Railway stations in Great Britain opened in 1887
Railway stations in Great Britain closed in 1930
1887 establishments in England
1953 disestablishments in England